Our Lady of Lourdes Academy is a Catholic all-girls high school in the unincorporated community of Ponce-Davis in Miami-Dade County, Florida, United States. It has been managed by the Immaculate Heart of Mary since its 1963 foundation.

In 2006, Our Lady of Lourdes Academy was named one of the Top 50 Catholic high schools in the U.S. by the Catholic High School Honor Roll. It has also been named a Blue Ribbon School of Excellence.

Notable alumni
Gloria Estefan, singer and seven-time Grammy award winner
Suki Lopez, actor, Sesame Street
Ana Villafañe, actress, played role of Gloria Estefan in Broadway musical On Your Feet!

References

External links
Official website
 

Educational institutions established in 1963
Catholic secondary schools in Florida
Roman Catholic Archdiocese of Miami
Private high schools in Miami-Dade County, Florida
Girls' schools in Florida
1963 establishments in Florida